This is a list of gliders/sailplanes of the world, (this reference lists all gliders with references, where available) Note: Any aircraft can glide for a short time, but gliders are designed to glide for longer.

Spanish miscellaneous constructors 
 AeroJaén RF5-AJ1 Serrania – Aeronaútica del Jaén SA
 Cases Libel-lula – Francisco Cases Masia
 CYPA-14
 CYPA-19
 Iberavia IP-2
 Ingeniero Industrial (glider)
 Viana (glider)
 P.L.A.V.I.A. Gurripato II – Gil Cacho & García Ontiveros
 Alfaro ACA 1910

Notes

Further reading

External links

Lists of glider aircraft